Tiago Luís Martins (born 13 March 1989), known as Tiago Luís, is a Brazilian footballer who plays as a forward for São Bernardo.

Football career
Born in Ribeirão Preto, São Paulo, Tiago Luís emerged through local Santos FC's youth ranks, and won the State League with the club in his last year as a junior. He made his senior debut on 27 January 2008 in the same competition, against Clube Atlético Bragantino, scoring in that match.

Also during that timeframe, media addressed an eventual interest in Luís from La Liga giants Real Madrid, but nothing came of it. In August 2009, after only three more Série A games for Santos, the player was loaned to U.D. Leiria in Portugal. During his only season with the top division side, he only started in five of the league games he appeared in, scoring only once in official matches (in a 1–1 home draw against C.D. Trofense in the League Cup).
 
On 6 January 2011, Tiago Luís joined Série B side Associação Atlética Ponte Preta, on loan until the end of the season. After serving another temporary deals at Esporte Clube XV de Novembro (Piracicaba) and Clube Atlético Bragantino, he was released by Peixe on 9 January 2013.

Tiago Luís moved to Mirassol Futebol Clube on 29 January 2013. After appearing regularly he moved to Associação Chapecoense de Futebol on 15 May, contributing with 21 appearances and two goals as his side were promoted to the first division after a 35-year absence.

References

External links

1989 births
Living people
Brazilian footballers
Association football forwards
Campeonato Brasileiro Série A players
Campeonato Brasileiro Série B players
Santos FC players
Associação Atlética Ponte Preta players
Vila Nova Futebol Clube players
Clube Atlético Bragantino players
Associação Chapecoense de Futebol players
Joinville Esporte Clube players
América Futebol Clube (MG) players
Paysandu Sport Club players
Goiás Esporte Clube players
Esporte Clube São Bento players
Associação Desportiva Confiança players
São Bernardo Futebol Clube players
Primeira Liga players
U.D. Leiria players
Tiago Luis
Brazilian expatriate footballers
Brazilian expatriate sportspeople in Portugal
Brazilian expatriate sportspeople in Thailand
Expatriate footballers in Portugal
Expatriate footballers in Thailand
People from Ribeirão Preto
Footballers from São Paulo (state)